Ivan Lendl was the defending champion, but did not compete this year.

Guy Forget won the title by defeating Goran Ivanišević 6–4, 6–3 in the final.

Seeds

Draw

Finals

Top half

Bottom half

References

External links
 Official results archive (ATP)
 Official results archive (ITF)

1990 ATP Tour
ATP Bordeaux